Charles Williams (died 1830) was a British caricaturist, etcher and illustrator. He was chief caricaturist between 1799 and 1815 for the leading British publisher S. W. Fores. He worked in a style similar to James Gillray. In his earlier works, Williams used the pseudonyms Ansell or Argus; with George Cruikshank and others he illustrated The Every-Day Book by William Hone, edited 1825–26.

Williams was the first of many who caricatured the 1st Duke of Wellington; he published a drawing of him in September 1808, during the Peninsular War, in which the Duke cuts off the pigtail of French general Jean-Andoche Junot, defeated at the Battle of Vimeiro.

Works 
 J. Mitford The Adventures of Johnny Newcome in the Navy (1819)
 W. Combe Doctor Syntax in Paris, or, a Tour in Search of the Grotesque (1820)
 The Tour of Doctor Prosody: in Search of the Antique and Picturesque (1821)
 My Cousin in the Army, or, Johnny Newcome on the Peace Establishment (1822)

Sources

 Catalogue of Political and Personal Satires Preserved in the Department of Prints and Drawings in the British Museum, Mary Dorothy George. Vol VI 1938,  Vol VII, 1942  VOL VIII 1947, VOL IX 1949
 Dictionary of British Cartoonists and caricaturists 1730-1980 Bryant and Heneage, Scolar Press 1994

External links

Charles Williams (British Museum Bio)

Year of birth missing
1830 deaths
18th-century engravers
19th-century engravers
English engravers
British illustrators
English illustrators
English cartoonists
English caricaturists